John P. Donohue, M.D.  (1932–2008) was the Chairman of the Urology Department and Distinguished Professor Emeritus at Indiana University School of Medicine. He pioneered treatments for testicular cancer, including the nerve-sparing technique. His work with Dr. Lawrence Einhorn led to an increase in cure rate of testicular cancer from 5% to 90%. He studied under Wyland F. Leadbetter. He began his career as a United States Navy officer while serving as the ship's surgeon aboard the aircraft carrier .

Training
Donohue graduated from Iona Preparatory School, New Rochelle, New York. He studied at Holy Cross College in Worcester, Massachusetts, graduating in 1954. He received his medical degree from Cornell University Medical College, completed initial surgical training at the New York Hospital and received his urological training at Massachusetts General Hospital. After completing his training, he moved to Indianapolis, Indiana.

Career
Donohue served in the United States Navy reserve from July 1960 to July 1962, achieving the rank of lieutenant. He served on the USS Wasp for one year and the U.S. Naval Hospital Chelsea, Massachusetts for one year. Early in his career, he was the chairman of a committee to develop new and better techniques for kidney transplants. This committee developed two highly specialized areas, one includes use of artificial kidneys and the other is based on tissue typing to match donors and recipients to reduce transplant rejection. This was on the heels of the passing of the Uniform Anatomical Gift Act, which Donohue identified as making it logistically easier to perform transplants.

In 1971, he became Professor of Urology and Chairman of the Department at Indiana University School of Medicine. While in this position, he became renown in the field of testicular tumors and renal hypertension. He authored numerous articles on testicular cancer and developed a radical surgery to treat it. He was on the team at the Indiana University Cancer Center treated cyclist Lance Armstrong for testicular cancer.

Later years
Dr. Donohue retired to Melbourne Beach, Florida. He was buried at Saint Joseph Catholic Cemetery in Palm Bay, Florida.

Notes

External links

Indiana University Biography 

1932 births
2008 deaths
20th-century surgeons
American people of Irish descent
American surgeons
American urologists
College of the Holy Cross alumni
Iona Preparatory School alumni
Indiana University faculty
Massachusetts General Hospital residents
People from Melbourne Beach, Florida
People from Indianapolis
People from Westchester County, New York
United States Navy Medical Corps officers
United States Navy reservists
Weill Cornell Medical College alumni
Burials in Florida